The Orchard End Murder is a 1980 British short thriller film by Marnham & Harvey Productions. It was directed and written by Christian Marnham, and stars Tracy Hyde, Bill Wallis, Clive Mantle, and Raymond Adamson. It marked the film debut of Clive Mantle. The film was theatrically released in the United Kingdom on 1 November 1981 as a support to Dead & Buried.

Plot
In Kent in 1966, a young woman called Pauline Cox (Tracy Hyde) wanders off to explore the countryside surroundings after accompanying her boyfriend to a cricket match as she is bored. She meets an eccentric stationmaster (Bill Wallis). After having tea with him, she meets his half-witted assistant called Ewen (Clive Mantle) who kills a rabbit which disgusts and upsets her. She runs off but meets Ewen again in the nearby orchard. Clearly having feelings for her, he kisses her but she tries to escape from him on a pile of apples. He pulls her down, rapes her and strangles her to death. Ewan then asks the stationmaster to help him bury her body in the orchard which he does. The next day, Ewen is arrested, when a detective sees him drop his tools when he jokes to him that people will think he’s the murderer.

Cast
 Tracy Hyde as Pauline Cox
 Clive Mantle as Ewen
 Bill Wallis as Railway Gatekeeper
 Raymond Adamson as Mr. Wickstead
 Jessie Evans as Mrs. Trowel
 Mollie Maureen as Old Lady at Station
 Cyril Cross as Village Policeman
 Mark Hardy as Robins
 David Wilkinson as Batsman
 Geoffrey Frederick as Cricket Captain
 Peter Hutchins as Detective
 Alexander John as Radio News Reader
 Alan Neame as Rector
 Rik Mayall as Policeman [uncredited]

References

External links
 

British thriller films
1980 films
British short films
1980 thriller films
1980s English-language films
1980s British films